Mend-Ooyo Gombojav is a Mongolian writer, poet and calligraphist. He was born into a herder's family in Dariganga, Sükhbaatar, Mongolia, in 1952. Mend-Ooyo lives in Ulaanbaatar, Mongolia, and directs the Mongolian Academy of Culture and Poetry.

Mend-Ooyo is quoted saying: "My life is the mirror of Mongolia. I grew up in the classic nomadic way of life, then moved to the city. But even after all these years I am not a city person. All my dreams are about the countryside, and I feel like I am living in a birdcage. Now I am planning to move back to the countryside. I just hope Mongolia will too."

Career 
He started his career in 1970, as an elementary school teacher in the border village of Zamiin Uud, Dornogovi aimag, in the far south east of Mongolia. For ten years, from 1978, he was the editor-in-chief for the arts and cultural programmes on Mongolian State radio and television, In 1988 he became a professional writer with the Mongolian Writer's Union.

After the 1990 Democratic Revolution in Mongolia, Mend-Ooyo became the Chief Project Lead and driving force behind the reconstruction of the Migjid Janraisig complex at Gandantegchinlen Monastery in Ulaanbaatar. At that time he was also a member of the Mongolian National Committee of UNESCO, and, successively, executive director, vice-president and president of the Mongolian Cultural Foundation. From 1998-2000 he sat as Chairman of the governmental Culture and Arts Agency.

In 2002 he became Life member of the World Academy of Arts and Culture. In 2004 he joined the board of the Mongolian Art Council. In 2005 he founded the Mongolian culture, literature and poetry magazine GUNU, for which he also acted as the editor-in-chief. In that same year he became president of the Mongolian Academy of Culture and Poetry. In 2006 he became the President of the 26th World Congress of Poets in Mongolia. He joined in fellow residency program in Civitella Ranieri Foundation in 2014, and also led the World Poetry Days in Mongolia in 2017.

In 1996, Mend-Ooyo earned a Master's degree at the University of Arts and Culture in Mongolia. In 2002, he was granted a Doctorate of Literature by the World Academy of Arts and Culture. In 2008, he became professor of Arts and Culture at the Institute of International Studies of the Mongolian Academy of Sciences. In 2015, the University of Arts and Culture, Mongolia granted him Honorary doctor for his achievement in literature.

Poetry 
Mend-Ooyo started writing poems at the age of thirteen. In an interview for the WSJ he explains he became interested in writing, thanks in part to Dorjiin Gombojav. D.Gombojav was a controversial poet and translator who had alienated officials in Ulaanbaatar. He was sent, as punishment, to teach at the remote rural school Mend-Ooyo attended. Mend-Ooyo related to the interviewer that he wrote his first lines of poetry under D.Gombojav's guidance. "He taught me the importance of Mongolian language and our traditions," he says.

In the late 1970s, he was one of the founder members of the underground literary group GAL (Fire). Mend-Ooyo explained that at the time, communist censors wouldn't let groups meet. "They were always watching us, so we had to be very careful and meet in people's homes at night." The GAL group, active in the late 1970s and early 1980s, included mainly Mend-Ooyo, Ochirbatyn Dashbalbar and D.Nyamsüren. Though GAL was "organised around the so-called Dariganga Three", others were at times involved as well. According to Simon Wickham-Smith, they "came to dominate the poetry scene during the subsequent ten or fifteen years, and their work is vital for a proper understanding of recent literary history in Mongolia."

GAL transformed during the 1980s into an "independent flow of literary writing called GUNU", whose writers "nowadays exercise(s) the greatest influence on Mongolian literature."

In the 1980s, Mend-Ooyo  was allowed to publish some of his poetry after it was vetted by officials. Later, in 1988, Mend-Ooyo became a member of the Mongolian Writers' Union.

In 1980, he published his first book of poetry, The Bird of Thought. Many were to follow. After the 1990 Democratic Revolution in Mongolia and the end of single-party communist rule, he started to publish more of his work, "including the writing that espoused his pastoral roots and eventually became his best-known poems." Since his first book, he has published over twenty other books of poetry, and over a dozen novels and children's books.

Altan Ovoo (Golden Hill) is an ongoing work of poetic fiction that has become one of the most influential pieces of contemporary Mongolian literature. First published in 1993, its fifth edition was published in 2010. Altan Ovoo has been translated into English by Simon Wickham-Smith in 2007. According to Wickham-Smith, Mend-Ooyo has referred to this book as his most important work. Mend-Ooyo constantly rearranges and edits "the elements of the narrative, to such an extent that it seems sometimes to be more an experimental novel (à la B.S. Johnson perhaps) than a work by a romantic and deeply traditional Central Asian writer," explains Wickham-Smith.

Altan Ovoo has been the focus of Simon Wickham-Smith's Ph.D. dissertation at the University of Washington. He explains that "Mend-Ooyo's poetic novel Altan Ovoo offers a vision of nomadic literature based as much on the history and worldview of Mongol nomadic herders as on the late twentieth century Mongolia, poised between Soviet-influenced socialism and Euro-American democratic capitalism, in which it was written."  In his dissertation, Wickham-Smith presents "Altan Ovoo as a prism through which the ideas on which nomadic culture is based can be shown as being central to the self-image of Mongolia's people, both in relation to the past and to the future."

Gegeenten (The Holy One), published in 2012, is a modern example of the traditional Mongolian genre of namtar, non-canonical biographies of Buddhist saints intended to be read by common people. Mend-Ooyo explains that Gegeenten tells the story of the Noton Hutagt Dulduityn Danzanravjaa. It tells "of his realisation of, and how he expressed, the secret wisdom in the teaching and practise of the historical Buddha and his descendents." The story, according to the writer, "also reveals how Danzanravjaa's life speaks to Mongol intellectual culture and the nomadic tradition of the Gobi area in which he lived, and how this tradition is an expression of the land and the environment in which he lived." According to Maria Petrova, Gegeenten "can be called the first prose work, where the image of the great Gobi Noenkhutukhta (sic) and poet D.Ravzhi (sic) found artistic expression."

In addition to his poetry and his novels, Mend-Ooyo has also written over half a dozen research books, with topics ranging from Old Mongol script to poetry critiques, Dariganga folklore and consumer culture amongst the Mongolian nomads.

Mend-Ooyo's work has been translated into over thirty languages, including English, Japanese, Hungarian, Russian, Chinese, Dutch, German and French.

Mend-Ooyo writes his poetry by hand. He tried to write his poetry on the computer. He says of this experience: "It was amazing how easy and peaceful it was to erase what I had written, to begin again, to change words and to rearrange them, and to adjust the rhythm of a poem. When I had finished my poem, I printed it out. I read it. The spirit with which I had been born was missing, there was no mental engagement in it." And: "I understood that my manuscript was the soul of my poem, the source of its spiritual power. A writer's manuscript is the calligraphy which shows the unrepeatable beating of their heart, the pathway through their warm life."

Awards 
Mend-Ooyo has been awarded many prizes from literary organizations around the world. Most notably, he has been named Distinguished cultural figure of Mongolia, by decree of the President of Mongolia in 1996; received the Award of the Mongolian Writers' Union in 1999; and was named Best Man of the Year 2001, and honoured as one of the nine most renowned people in Mongolia. In 2001, Mend-Ooyo was awarded the Altan Ud (Golden Feather) award, Mongolia's Writer of the Year. In 2006, the year of the 800th Anniversary of Great Mongolian Empire, Mend-Ooyo was awarded the Anniversary medal by the President of Mongolia. In 2012, Mend-Ooyo once again received the Altan Ud award, for his book Gegeenten.

He received many international award and accolades, from China to England, Greece and Korea, India, Japan and the USA. In 2005, he received the Medallion of the President award of the World Academy of Arts and Culture "for poetic excellence". In that same year, he won First prize in the poetry contest of the XXV World Congress of Poets. 2006 saw him receiving a string of awards from Greece, Korean and India, in addition to the Golden Gavel Award of the World Academy of Arts and Culture, and the Golden Medal of the Literary Academy of World Peace. 2008 was also a rewarding year for Mend-Ooyo, with awards from the Crane Summit 21st Century International (Poetry) Forum and the Soka Gakkai University. In 2009, Mend-Ooyo was named Poet Laureate (with Golden Crown), the highest poetry award of the World Congress of Poets. In 2014, he was awarded the Grand Prize of the Mihai Eminescu International Festival in Craiova, Romania. In 2015 he received the Order of Chinggis Khaan, the highest honor of Mongolia, by the declaration of Mongolian President.

Poetry and cultural events 
Mend-Ooyo has organized a number of poetry and cultural events in Mongolia. Most notably, he organized the XXVI World Congress of Poets in Mongolia, held in 2006.

He participated in many poetry events around the world, such as the 12th Festival of World Youth and Students, Moscow, Russia in 1985; the Asian-African Young Writers Forum, New Delhi in 1987; the World Bank Conference Cultural Heritage, Florence, Italy in 1999; the Japanese-Mongolian Forum, Tokyo in 1999; the International Poetry Festival, Tokyo, Japan in 2000; the 21st, 22nd, 25th, 28th and 29th World Congress of Poets in 2001, 2004, 2005, 2008 and 2009; the Crane Summit 21st Century International Poetry and Culture Forum, Taipei, Taiwan in 2005; the Asian Pan-Pacific X Poetry Conference, Tokyo in 2005; the Qinghai Lake International Poetry Festival, China in 2007; the Jan Smrek International Literary Festival, Bratislava, Slovakia in 2008; the Soka Gakka International Forum, Tokyo, Japan in 2008; the Struga International Poetry Evenings, Ohrid, Macedonia in 2009; the 1st International Pen Ural Altay Conference, Istanbul, Turkey in 2009; the 60th Anniversary of R.O.C Literature and Art Festival, Taipei, Taiwan in 2010; the 7th annual Stanford Pan-Asian Music Festival, San Francisco, USA in 2011; and the 3rd Ural Altaic PEN solidarity network Congress, Ulaanbaatar, Mongolia in 2011.

In 2014, Mend-Ooyo was artist in residence at the Civitella Ranieri Foundation in Umbria, Italy.

Calligraphy 

While his fame is mainly based on his poetry, Mend-Ooyo has also found acclaim as a calligrapher, specialising in traditional Mongolian calligraphy. His work has been exhibited in Mongolia in the Poetry and Calligraphy exhibition in Ulaanbaatar in 2006; the 2007 Coming Time poetry and calligraphy exhibition in the Zanabazar Museum in Ulaanbaatar; the 2010 Crystal Temple of Mend-Ooyo's soul poetry and calligraphy exhibition in the Mongolian Modern Art Gallery in Ulaanbaatar, opened by the Mongolian President Tsakhiagiin Elbegdorj.

In 2011, the Дэлхий ээж (Delhii eej: Earth Mother, Mother Earth, or World Mother) poetry and calligraphy exhibition was held in the Mongolian Modern Art Gallery in Ulaanbaatar, in collaboration with another calligrapher, D.Battömör. Before setting out creating some sixty calligraphies, Battömör first read two of Mend-Ooyo's (All Shining Moments and A Patch of White Mist) for inspiration. Together they choose the calligraphies they thought best expressed in calligraphic form Mend-Ooyo's verse. The poems were then written into the calligraphies in manuscript (as opposed to draw them with a brush). Afterwards, Battömör and Mend-Ooyo stamped their seals on these calligraphies. This exhibition traveled to Japan in 2012, where it showed at the Kyoritsu Women's University in Tokyo.

In 2012, Mend-Ooyo showed his calligraphy in The Steppe calligraphy exhibition at the Art House Center in Ulaanbaatar.

Also in 2012, fourteen of his calligraphy works, curated by S.Sumiya were exhibited in the Museum Café of the Allard Pierson Museum in Amsterdam, The Netherlands during a Mongolia Festival which was held against the backdrop of the museum exhibition Horse & Rider - From Homer to Genghis Khan.

In 2014, Mend-Ooyo participated in the joint calligraphy exhibition Sky, Sun and Partnership, held at the Blue Moon Art Gallery, in celebration of the 40th anniversary of Mongolian-Japanese cultural relations. The line-up of artists included public figures such as the Mongolian President Tsakhiagiin Elbegdorj, then Mongolian Prime Minister Norovyn Altankhuyag and the Japanese Prime Minister Shinzō Abe. The Sky, Sun, Partnership exhibition traveled to Japan in March, 2015. Mend-Ooyo opened the exhibition, which was held at the Itochu Aoyama Art Square. Some of the exhibited pieces were to be auctioned for charity, the proceeds donated to volunteer groups to support the recovery of the area affected by the 2011 Great East Japan earthquake.

Song lyrics 
A writer and poet, Mend-Ooyo is also on occasion a song writer. The lyrics to the song Delhii eej (Earth Mother), first put to music by R.Enhbazar in 1985, are well known in Mongolia. Other song lyrics of Mend-Ooyo's hand are Eejiin buuveitei horvoo (World with mother's buuvei), music by R.Enhbazar, 1981; Enh ugluu (Peaceful morning), music by R.Enhbazar, 1982; Namriin ineemseglel (Smiles of autumn), music by R.Enhbazar, 1983; Malchin (Herdsmen), music by D.Battömör, 1985; Aduu molor erdene (Horse is treasure), music by N.Jantsannorov, 1992; Telmen huh zereglee (Blue miracle), music by N.Jantsannorov, 1995; Altan urgiin nutag (Pastures of golden blood), music by Hatanbaatar, 2004; and Orchlon delhiidee bid jargaltai (We are happy at our Earth), music by D.Tsogdelger.

Themes in Mend-Ooyo's poetry 
Mend-Ooyo's writing deals with the life of Mongolia's nomadic herders, their culture and cultural knowledge. In his style and thematic material, he seeks to express the melody and richness of the Mongol language and nomadic society.

Mend-Ooyo explains his work in his short essay My Gentle Lyric - translated by S.Sumiya - thus: "I have long been absorbed by the fundamental nature of my nomadic ancestors, believing in them, favouring and cherishing their quiet, gentle melody. The gentle melody is the nature of my poetry. The wheels of the wooden cart which turn without harming the grass, the quiet character of the elders who avoid stepping on the flowers, the trust of the nomads who have no locks on their doors... it seems that the short road to purity lies here."

As the poet Ruth O'Callaghan explains in her foreword to Mend-Ooyo's book of poetry A Patch of White Mist Mend-Oyoo's poetry is rooted in his Mongolian heritage. According to O'Callaghan, Mend-Ooyo "engages us not only with a superb lyricism but also a profound philosophy" based in Buddhism. Where most people would settle for a philosophy that fits easily and neatly in this modern world, Mend-Ooyo courageously "continues on his quest to discover his own unique position [...] for his existence," in the process crossing impossible boundaries. Mend-Ooyo's philosophy - as he words it in his poetry - is fuelled by Buddhism. Meditation stokes in him a deep empathy with the whole of creation. This profound life-long involvement with Buddhism is the source of Mend-Ooyo's strength; a strength that "an urgency to Mend-Ooyo's poetry in his chronicling of his pursuit of selfhood that is so lucidly and lyrically expressed."

Born into a herdsman's family in Dariganga, Sükhbaatar, Mongolia, in 1952, Mend-Ooyo grew up riding horses and tending sheep, moving over the steppe by camel caravan. Today, he leads a life very different from his childhood, moving across the world by air plane, his mobile phone constantly ringing and his office in Ulaanbaatar crowded by many Mongolian and foreign visitors. Yet, his heart remains faithful to the old ways of the steppe. Despite his achievements, Mend-Ooyo's is acutely aware that "to leave behind one's heritage is to court disaster."

O'Callaghan explains that Mend-Ooyo's poetry weaves a rich tapestry that will live long in the mind of the Western reader. Mend-Ooyo explores the intimate connection between "the personal and the universal." He expresses himself with delicate perception and a gift for language. Western readers will be excited to find that Mend-Ooyo's poetry offers an "informative, introductory insight into the Mongolian psyche – a psyche which embraces the topography not simply of Mongolia or even the universe but of the world beyond this world, an 'otherness' which travels with the poet as surely as his nomadic ancestors."

Simon Wickham-Smith - translator and currently a lecturer at Rutgers University in New Jersey, USA - in his foreword to Mend-Ooyo's children's book Quickwit The Camel, explains Mend-Ooyo's philosophy as the expression of the "profound relationship between Mongolians and the landscape of their country, its physical and historical contours, its spiritual and cultural traditions and, most importantly perhaps, its visionary pathways." He continues to explain that for Mongolians, their landscape is their ancestors. Especially in his book Golden Hill does Mend-Ooyo present - both in poetry and in prose - an admixture of dream, myth, cultural and social history, memoir, (auto)biography, and natural history.

In an interview Simon Wickham-Smith says: "The idea of traditional Mongolian culture is paramount to Mend-Ooyo. He is trying to keep the nomadic spirit alive in spite of modernization" He adds "Mr. Mend-Ooyo is arguably the most important poet in Mongolia today, and certainly the one with the most presence, though some of the newer generation might say he is a bit stuck in the past."

In the same article for the WSJ, Bavuudorj Tsogdorj, 43 years old and an exponent of the younger generation of Mongolian poets, expresses his belief that "his increasingly urbanized countrymen will eventually appreciate their nomadic tradition." He continues: "Younger poets are now writing with European thoughts and styles, but they will come back to Mongolian poetry and thoughts someday. At that time Mend-Ooyo will be really valuable." He adds: "Mend-Ooyo is Mongolia's poetry representative — he is a genuine nomadic poet."

Today, Mend-Ooyo puts his energy into rethinking the modern Mongolian way of life. In an interview he explains that "he envisions a 21st-century nomadic community in which schools, health care and markets move with the people, allowing them to maintain their mobility while providing some of the benefits of contemporary society." As he says it: "It's my dream to build it." And: "The reason nomads come to the cities is to get education for their children, hospital access. We want to allow nomads to be more modern, to use cellphones and Internet. Keep the old life, just make it better."

Opinions and Comments 
"Mend-Ooyo is an artist, full of good deeds, spreading the best of Mongolian culture and customs to the public nationally and internationally as his fame echoes not only across Mongolia but also beyond our borders." Mongolian President Elbegdorj Tsakhia's speech at the order of Chinghis Khaan award ceremony. 2015.11.12 "Gombojav dispune de darul meditaţiei versulsău stậrneşte cititorul, il pune pe ganduri, transmitandu-i propriile trairi passionale, intr-o comuniune intima cu elementele primordial ale naturii, cu insasi viata, intr-un registru lucid, calm, dar profubd emotional." Anthologia poeziei universal de astazi, Editura EUROPA Craiova, Romania. 2014  "It is a poetry that starts from a concrete fact and transforms into a timeless art. The elements that compose it stop having a date, lose their significance and become symbols that recover the imagination as a temperature and fruity sensation of life, forging itself with its most intense expression. It is time without intermediaries through which we arrive at the presence of the unknown, to the true mystery of poetry where the end resembles the beginning. This present never happens in a linear time even if it seems so. It opens a path in space, makes the immensity navigable. That is why I love the meaning of his verbal prayer, that hidden power he has of returning to the everyday, to the rumor of his words, to that innocent smile of his poetic voice where everything remains insinuated, confessed, said." Justo Jorge Padron, Spanish poet. "Mend-ooyo, el gran poeta contemporáneo de Mongolia" suplemento de  caudernos del matemático n° 50, Madrid. 2013""The Holy One" (Gegeenten) is a most impressive and skilfully-written literary novel, free from any petty constraints, and as close to a true account as we have had during the last hundred years of culture and history. In today's world we have the freedom to write pieces which show how wisdom and behavior are connected, such as an elite writer like Mend-Oyoo does by examining and revealing the facts and scholarship, and by unpacking the rumors and the history, and this most striking of works has indeed reached such a level."Prof.Dr.Ch.Biligsaihan Literary critic, Unuudur, newspaper, 10.10.2012"More than any other extended piece of contemporary Mongolian literature, G Mend-Ooyo's Altan Ovoo (Golden Hill) expresses the profound relationship between Mongolians and the landscape of their country, its physical and historical contours, its spiritual and cultural traditions and, most importantly perhaps, its visionary pathways.  For Mongolians, their landscape is their ancestors, and Altan Ovoo (Golden Hill) presents in poetry and prose an admixture of dream, myth, history (cultural and social), memoir, auto/biography, and natural history.
	He is constantly rearranging and editing the elements of the narrative, to such an extent that it seems sometimes to be more an experimental novel (à la B S Johnson perhaps) than a work by a romantic and deeply traditional Central Asian writer."Dr.Simon Wickham-Smith /UK/ Translator and scholar of Mongolian lliterature
"Translator's introduction" Golden Hill, 2007, p xi"In the centre of the image system is the Altan Ovoo – mythical world mountain Sumeru, which connects Earth and Sky, upper, middle and lower worlds. The coexistence of secular and sacral worlds, the union of real and mythical spheres, poetical style, the usage of prose and poetry give the work by G.Mend-Ooyo mystical enchantment. This was also noted by Mongolian and European readers and literary critics. To my mind, modern presentation of traditional legends and ballades by G.Mend-Ooyo is a conscious author's position. It demonstrates creative usage of folklore in Modern Mongolian literature."Dr. Petrova M.P scholar of Mongolian study  /Saint-Petersburg State University, Russia/ Old Legends in Modern Literature: Mystical Enchantment of G.Mend-Ooyo's Works. Нүүдэлчний уран зохиолыг шинжлэхүй. УБ., 2011. х.82-88."Your Poems enthrall me. Your Poem "I am coming to you" is Super, a Millennium Poem."  Dr. Krishna Srinivas. Founder of World Congress of Poets, President of World Poetry Society, Founder and Editor-in-chief of POET magazine"I would like to add that I consider you to be a poet of the first order. Your poem "I am coming to You" thrilled my heart and soul. You are "seeking for the eternal song the essence of love." You are not only a poet but also a genuine seeker of the highest Truth. I do hope that we may one day meet together in your beloved Mongolia. Mend-Ooyo is a profoundly spiritual seer-poet. His mantric poems immediately transport the readers into the Heart of Eternity's Infinity." Sri Chinmoy. Poet, Composer, Painter, and Perfect Enlightener. "Poetry – A Heaven Climbing Song, lecture" 15p, 2007"There is an evident explosion in the images and in the lyricism of an encased world, a recovery of terrestrial love with that added and confronted duality: that of tenderness and absence. His gaze sees man in time, disguised at times by simple simplicity, always has the strength of the humble and the magnitude of the true and essential. Sometimes it has a point of hallucination, silence, revelation and prophecy that knows very well the loneliness of man, turning the question into destiny and destiny into a question that teaches us to interrogate." Justo Jorge Padron, Spanish poet. "Mend-ooyo, el gran poeta contemporáneo de Mongolia" suplemento de caudernos del matemático n° 50, Madrid. 2013"...His poems are really thrilling. As Emerson says this poet is incredible. The poet is incredible, inexplicable. The poet works to an end above his will and by means, too, which is out of his will..."Dr. Justice S. Mohan. Poet, India 2006

"In his new book, The Crystal Temple of Meaning, G Mend-Ooyo, a poet of peace and spirituality, brings to a level of mental stillness whomever enters this temple, pure and elegant as crystal, and singing with thought.  His intention is to compare this volume of poems with a bright and calming temple…"Dr Tadanori Matsuda . Professor of Literature /Japan/2005"G Mend-Ooyo's work, the basis of his poetry, is simple:  it is, as the name of his book suggests, that Nomads are Coming from the Horizon.  The point where Heaven and Earth meet, the mutual worship of nature and human beings, intuition and the gently melody of the inner mind – this is the Golden Hill of his wisdom, in all that he writes there is the poetry of nomads and the memory of nomadism.  Mend-Ooyo's poetic œuvre is the essence and mentality of the Mongol nomad, it is the call of Heaven, its writing  is the sweet melody of the Mongol vertical script, and its magic waves of poetry are valued throughout the world."Dr U. Hurelbaatar . Critic,  head of the Mongol Center for Literary Research /Mongolia/"When I finished reading this book of poetry, G Mend-Ooyo's In Timeless Light, I recalled something said by Martin Heidegger in his book Holzwege.  He wrote, "In this time of confusion, how heavy is the poet's burden! And when I read the first poem in this book, "Connective Meaning," I had the thought that Mend-Oyoo has found indeed what the poet might in fact be able to do in our current time of confusion. So the poet and his poetic works are clearly revealing the inner world of human qualities.  The poetry leads us back to the source.  And thus we consider clearly the difference between intention and reality.  It for sure is this poet's bright and undying world which is manifest in us."Dr Shi Chao-yin. Louvain University, Belgium, 2007"G Mend-Ooyo's poetry has developed through his investigation of viewpoint and is able to express life through the simplicity of his language.  And so the particular attitude of nomadic poetry is brought closer to the world stage.  In other words, through his poetic work, which is the contemplation and worship of that meaning which reveals what is secret and which grants perspective, the special characteristics of oriental poetry are revealed."Dr D Tseveendorj. Researcher, critic and Professor of Literature, 2007"G Mend Ooyo, is a superb writer, essentially is a poet who inscribes his lyric in both, poets and prose. His book entitled "Altan Ovoo (Golden Hill)" is a master piece which transports the readers into the steppes, people, history, and mystery of Mongolia. In the book nature and mind are united and presented in a poetic suggestive symbiosis…" Prof. Ernesto Kahan, poet, Nobel Peace Prize Winner, 1985 /Izreal&Argentina/2008"You are such a great and absolutely first class poet. You have such a sharp eagle eye to notice this and express it in such a way that it irradiates all the optimism of your heart. Your "Altan Ovoo" is a loud shrill to us all that we can be still feel optimistic and never should go downhill into a morass or a chaotic overkill of the beauty, goodness and other treasures we can find around us in the world, especially in our native country but everywhere where we look and try to understand deeper the idyll of God's creation…" Prof. Imre P.Zsoldos. Poet, translator /Hungary/  2008"Dr G Mend-Ooyo is immersed in nature and his poems are not free from it. It would be more apt so say that nature is his forte…" Prof. S.P.Guruparan. Political Science Presidency Colledge, Chennai, India 2006"…His poems are wonderful indepth meaning in simple language will attract the attention of the common people."Dr.Va.Mu.Sethuraman. Poet. Tamil Nadu, Chennai, India 2006"Mend-Oyoo's poetry is firmly rooted within his Mongolian heritage – a heritage that is simultaneously embedded within and distinct from the entire universe. Hence, from the very opening poem In Search Of Myself the poet engages us not only with a superb lyricism but also a profound philosophy that has obviously been garnered over many decades of reflective study." Ruth O'Callaghan. Poet and publisher, UK, 2010"The poetry book /All Shining moments/ is wonderful to see. I found the introduction very interesting. The poetry is great, and very different from things I have read. The poets speak a lot about nature and space and the sky… obviously Mongolian influences, and I only wish I could hear the poems spoken in Mongolian. I think they would sound beautiful."Lesley Cowan. USA. 11 Nov, 2005."In particular, his work Altan Ovoo is a sincere, transparent poem of the true nomads and a magical poetic work expressing the aspiration for the safeguard of the natural essence and spiritual immunity of humankind and of the Mongols, who are being polluted and drowned in the urbanized social civilization..."Dr., Prof. Ya.Baatar. Critic /Mongolia/2005

Books

Poetry books in Mongolian 
 On tsagiin Khurd (The Wheel of Time), Ulaanbaatar 2016, 
 Heseg tsagaan manan (A Patch of White Mists), Ulaanbaatar 2010, 
 Gerelteh agshin bur (All shining moments), Ulaanbaatar 2010, 
 Altan Ovoo, (Golden Hill), 3rd edition, poetic novel, Ulaanbaatar 2007, 
 Tengeriin hayanaas nuudelchin aisui (Nomads are coming from the horizon) Ulaanbaatar 2002, 
 Altan Ovoo, (Golden Hill), 2nd edition, poetic novel, Ulaanbaatar 2002, 
 Utgiin Bolor Sum (Crystal  temple of the meaning), poetry collection, Ulaanbaatar 1997
 Altan Ovoo, (Golden Hill), poetic novel, Ulaanbaatar 1993
 Huuriin Magnai (Head of the fiddle), poetry collection,  Ulaanbaatar 1990
 Ulzii utas (The endless knot), poetry collection, Ulaanbaatar 1985
 Bodliin shuvuu (The bird of the thought), poetry collection, Ulaanbaatar 1980

Poetry Books in English and other languages 
 Poemas de un nomada de la estepa legendaria, poetry collection in Spanish, published by Ediciones Vitruvio, Madrid, 2017.  
 Meн Cafaн Келе Жатырмынь poetry collection in kazakh, Almata, Kazakhstan. 2017 
 Tous ces moments de lumiere, poetry collection in french, UB, 2016 
 Моята лирика, poetry collection in Bulgarian, published by Камея, Sofia, Bulgaria 2016, 
 Cuvinte nomade, poetry collection in Moldavian, published by Editura pentru Literature si Arta, Chisinau, Moldova, 2016, 
 Pastures New, poetry collection in English and Chinese, Taipei, Taiwan, 2015, 
 Mojata Питома Лирика, poetry collection in Macedonian, 2014, Skopje, Macedonia 
 I am coming to you, A poem in 30 languages, 2011 Ulaanbaatar, 
 Parole Nomade, poetry collection in French, tr. Imre P.Zsoldos, Ulaanbaatar 2010, 
 A Patch of White Mist, poetry collection in English, tr. Simon Wickham-Smith, Ulaanbaatar 2010, 
 Nomadska Lyrika, poetry collection in Macedonian, tr. Trajan Petrovsky, Skopje, Macedonia 2009, 
 Golden Hill, (Altan Ovoo) poetic novel, tr. Simon Wickham-Smith, Ulaanbaatar 2007, 
 Nomadic Lyrics, poetry collection, tr. Simon Wickham-Smith, Ulaanbaatar 2007, 
 Infinite Glare, selected poems in Mongolian, English and Chinese, Poem Culture Corp., Taipei, Taiwan 2006, 
 Mend-Ooyo's Poems, selected poems in English and Bengal, tr. Aminur Rahman, Dhaka & London 2006,  
 The Echo of Humanism, selected poems in Tamil and English, tr. Sh.Tsog and Va.Mu.Sethuraman, Chennai, India 2006
 All Shining Moments, selected poems, Cavco Printers, USA 2006
 All Shining Moments, selected poems in English and Japanese, tr. Sh.Tsog and Kae Morii,  Tokyo, Japan 2005
 All Shinning Moments, selected poems in English, tr. Sh.Tsog, Ulaanbaatar 2005
 I am coming to you-II, selected poems, in English and other, Ulaanbaatar  2001
 I am coming to you-I, selected poems in English and other, Ulaanbaatar 2000

Novels 
 The Holy One (in English), novel, translated by Simon Wickhamsmith, Ulaanbaatar 2017, 
 Oyun sanaanii heer tal, (The Steppe of Mind), essay-novel, Ulaanbaatar 2016, 
 Gol us tungalagshih tsag (The time purifying the rivers) essays, Ulaanbaatar 2015 
 Shilin Bogd, (The Sacred Mountain), novel, Ulaanbaatar 2015 
 Gegeenten (The Holy One), essay-novel, Ulaanbaatar 2012, 
 Altan Ovoo, poetic novel, tr Simon Wickham-Smith, Ulaanbaatar, 2012 
 Contes des Sages de Mongolie, in french (with Patrick Fishman), Seuil, Paris, France 2012, 
 Quickwit the camel, short fiction, in English, Ulaanbaatar 2010,  
 Morin huuriin domog, (Legend of the Morin Huur), in Mongolian, Ulaanbaatar 2005, 
 Legend of the Horse head fiddle, in English, Ulaanbaatar, 2005 
 Darigangiin huh shastir, (Blue book of Dariganga) essay novel in Mongolian, Ulaanbaatar 2004
 Morin Huuriin arvan hoyor zohiongui, (The twelve deeds of horse headed fiddle) in Mongolian, Ulaanbaatar 2003
 Morin huuriin sudar, (The sutra of Horse head fiddle) in Mongolian, Ulaanbaatar 2003, 
 Bilgiin melmii neegch, (The Opener of Wisdom Eyes), history, essay and meditation Sutra in Mongolian, Ulaanbaatar 1997

Children's books   
 Forty One Swans, in Mongolian, English and French, Ulaanbaatar 2017, 
 Huhuudei, in Mongolian and French, Ulaanbaatar 2012, 
 The Tale of Travelling Star, in Bengal, tr. Amarendra Chacravorty, India 2007, 
 The Tale of the traveling star, in Mongolian and English, Ulaanbaatar 2005, 
 Naiman shargiin duuli, (Ballad of Temuujin's eight whitish-yellow horses), Ulaanbaatar 2000
 Uulnaas undur temee, (A camel that is higher than the mountains), Ulaanbaatar 1984
 Jergee huurhun shuvuuhai, (A small singing Bird), Ulaanbaatar 1980

Anthologies of the best world poetry series in Mongolian   
 Three Hundred Poem, (Gurvan zuun shulegt) an anthology, selected from All Time, Ulaanbaatar, 2013, 
 Chinese Poetry, Best World Poetry series X, Ulaanbaatar 2011,  
 American Poetry - II, Best World Poetry series IX, Ulaanbaatar 2011,  
 Rainbow Bridge, Anthology of Japanese and Mongolian poets, Ulaanbaatar 2010, 
 American Poetry, Best World Poetry series VIII, Ulaanbaatar 2010,  
 Japanese Poetry, Best World Poetry series VII, Ulaanbaatar 2006, 
 Central Asian Poetry, Best World Poetry series VI, Ulaanbaatar 2006,  
 Spanish Poetry, Best World Poetry series V, Ulaanbaatar 2006, 
 French Poetry, Best World Poetry series IV, Ulaanbaatar 2006, 
 Indian Poetry, Best World Poetry series III, Ulaanbaatar 2006
 Russian Poetry, Best World Poetry series II, Ulaanbaatar 2006,

Publications of Mongolian poetry and literature in English  

 The Sun of the Gentle World, Mongolia's pre-modern poetry, anthology, Ulaanbaatar, 2017, 
 Gal, Mongolia's Last Underground Poets, selected poems and article of Gal poets, tr. Simon Wickhamsmith, published with NUM press, Ulaanbaatar 2015, 
 Danzanravjaa "A Song Arising from Contemplation" selected poems, tr. Simon Wickhamsmith, Ulaanbaatar 2013, 
 A Floral Wind, selected poems of Ts.Tsolmon (Inner Mongolian poet), tr. Simon Wickham-Smith, Ulaanbaatar 2013, 
 Stories from the Steppe,(short fiction from Mongolia) tr. Simon Wickham-Smith Ulaanbaatar 2012 
 Mongolian Verse, by Yavuuhulan, tr. Simon Wickham-Smith, Ulaanbaatar 2009, 
 An Entirety (Short stories), by BaastZolbayar, tr. Simon Wickham-Smith, Ulaanbaatar 2009, 
 The River Flows Gently, by O. Dashbalbar, tr. Simon Wickham-Smith, Ulaanbaatar Sky of Mind, by T. Erdenetsogt, tr. Simon Wickham-Smith, Ulaanbaatar 2008
 When Humans become Grass, by Ts. Bavuudorj, tr. Simon Wickham-Smith, Ulaanbaatar 2007, 
 An Anthology of Mongolian Literature, tr. Simon Wickham-Smith, Ulaanbaatar 2007, 
 The Battle for our Land Has Begun, by O. Dashbalbar, tr. Simon Wickham-Smith, Ulaanbaatar 2007, 
 A Very Big White Elephant (New voices in Mongolian poetry), tr. Sh.Tsog and Simon Wickham-Smith, Ulaanbaatar 2006, 
 The Best of Mongolian Poetry (Anthology of Mongolian poetry), tr. Sh. Tsog and Simon Wickham-Smith, Ulaanbaatar 2006, 
 Perfect Qualities, poetry collection of Fifth NoyonKhutagtuDanzanravjaa, tr.Simon Wickham-Smith, Ulaanbaatar 2006, 
 Ancient Splendor (Anthology Mongolian poetry), Ulaanbaatar 2006, 

 Articles, presentations and speeches in English 
 "Poetry is the Wisdom of Nature", main paper at the World Poetry Days in Mongolia, 17 August 2017, Ulaanbaatar, Mongolia. Published in issue 22 of GUNU magazine and Journal of Indian Research (issue July–September) 2017. 
 "A person exists in the words they speak" speech at the ceremony of the Order of Chinggis Khaan, highest award by the declaration of Mongolian President. 2015 www.president.mn 
 "Limitless Skies, Endless Journeys" Speech On Receiving the Mihai Eminescu International Poetry  Prize, on 16 September 2014, Craiova, Romania  
 "Mother earth: Indigenous culture and knowledge of Mongols to interrelation to nature" at Kyoritsu Women's University, Japan, 12 July 2012 "Let us go the future riding our magical energy of words with our indigenous culture" at Kapwa – 3 conference, Filippines, 2012 "What are these powerful waves of words?" Stanford Pan-Asian Music Festival, Stanford University, Cal., USA, 2011 http://www.mend-ooyo.mn/news/155.html
 "Wisdom and skillful means: the promotion of Mongol poetry", Stanford Pan-Asian Music Festival, Stanford University, Cal., USA, 2011 http://www.mend-ooyo.mn/news/153.html
 "The philosophy informing the Mongol horse head fiddle, the Morin Huur", Institute of East Asian Studies, Berkeley University, Cal., USA, 2011   http://www.mend-ooyo.com/Default.aspx?p_id=25&NewsID=35
 "The thoughts of heaven, transforming into grass", foreword to Ts.Bavuudorj "When human become grass" p6-7, UB 2008, 
 "Taking stories from rainbow to make a vessel of poetry", Rainbow Bridge, an anthology of Japanese Mongolian poetry, p3-8,UB 2009, 
 "Publisher's foreword", American Poetry book, p144-146, UB 2010, 
 "An interview with G Mend-Ooyo", by Takis Ioannides, "Epikaera" newspaper, Athens, Greece, 2007.04.28. №120
 "The issues of Uralic-Altay Language's Literature" 2010 http://uyghurpen.org/event-id11.html
 "The paths I have walked, pen in hand", 2010 http://www.mend-ooyo.mn/news/80.html
 "Yavuu's last word" http://thebestamericanpoetry.typepad.com/files/yavuus-last-word.pdf
 "Dark cranes, flying towards you" 2010 http://www.mend-ooyo.mn/news/83.html
 "A melody to shed light upon Yavuuhulan" foreword to Mongolian Verse, by Yavuuhulan, tr. Simon Wickham-Smith, Ulaanbaatar 2009, 
 "Poetics and the Pyramid" published in GUNU magazine, 2009 №16 autumn, p 75-80,   http://www.mend-ooyo.mn/news/157.html
 "Dashbalbar's prayer of love" foreword to "The battle for our land has begun" by O.Dashbalbar p34-44, ub, 2008,  http://blog.bestamericanpoetry.com/the_best_american_poetry/2009/03/modern-mongolian-literature-in-seven-days-part-4-o-dashbalbar-by-simon-wickhamsmith.html
 "The undulating and magic character of poetry and nature's energy", presentation at the 10th Asia Pan Pacific Poetry Conference, Tokyo, 2005 http://muzo.mn/en/1714
 "The nomads are coming from the Horizon", presentation at the World Congress of Mongolia, Iasi, Romania, 2002 http://muzo.mn/en/1715
 "Poetry purifying the soul" UB 2006, p158-160, 
 "Inspirational Power of Poetry", presentation at the World Congress of Poets, Sydnei, Australia 2001 
 "Dynamics and constancy of poetry", published in The Chinese Poetry International Quarterly, English and Chinese, volume No.24, Nov 8, 2001 "Evolutionary and non-evolutionary features in poetry, and contributions of the Mongolians to world poetry" presentation at the World Poets Forum, Tokyo, 2000 http://muzo.mn/en/1716
 "The effort of Mongolian literature in the humanity's civilization", presentation at the 7th Asian Poetry Forum, Ulaanbaatar, 1999

 Essays and critics about Mend-Ooyo's works 
 Justo Jorge Padron, Spanish poet, " La poesia de Mongolia en su decurso milenaria. Mend-Ooyo, el gran poeta contemporaneo de Mongolia", foreword to the poetry collection "Poemas de un nomada de la estepa legendaria", in Spanish, published by Ediciones Vitruvio, Madrid, 2017.   (in Spanish)
 Ts. Elbegdorj, President of Mongolia, "About Mend-Ooyo" at the ceremony of the Order of Chinggis Khaan, the supreme state award of Mongolia, 2015  (in Mongolian) 
 Per Bergström, "Fast förankrad i nomadlivet"
 Dr. Petrova M.P. Poet about Poet: G.Mend-Ooyo's Novel about D.Ravjaa. Issues of Far-east Literature, VI International Science Confrenece, Bladivostoc, 2014.  Proceeding book of the conference, p372-381 (in English) Dr. Petrova M.P. Историко-биографический роман Г.Мэнд-Ооёо «Светлейший». Проблемы литератур Дальнего Востока. VI Международная научная конференция. СПб., 2014. Т.2. Стр.372-381.Ежегодный международный конгресс алтаистов. Владивосток 9-14 сентября 2014. (in Russian) Kit Gillet "Poet fights to maintain Mongolia's Nomadic culture", The Wall Street Journal, Feb, 07, 2013 http://blogs.wsj.com/scene/2013/02/07/at-odds-with-mongolias-modernity-a-poet-seeks-another-way (in English) Dr.Simon Wickhamsmith, "The Interrelationship Humans and the Mongol land in G.Mend-Ooyo's ALTAN OVOO" published by The Edwin Mellen Press, February 2013, 466 pages, 2013, USA,     http://www.mellenpress.com/mellenpress.cfm?bookid=8815&pc=9 (in English) Justo Jorge Padron, "Mend-Ooyo, el Gran poeta contemporáneo de Mongolia" suplemento de Caudernos del Matemático n° 50, Madrid. 2013. (in Spanish) The Paris Review, "G.Mend-Ooyo, Ulaanbaatar, Mongolia" series of World Windows, March 1, 2013, by Matteo Pericoli http://www.theparisreview.org/blog/tag/g-mend-ooyo/ (in English) Dr. Petrova M.P. Mystical Enchantment in the Works of G. Mend-Ooyo.St. Petersburg Annual of Asian and African Studies: Volume 1,рр.147-155. (2012)  (in English) Dr. Khurelbaatar U, poetry critic, "Dariganga's poetic triad" Mongolia, 2011 (in English) Dr. Petrova M.P.. Old Legends in Modern Literature: Mystical Enchantment of G.Mend-Ooyo's Works. Нүүдэлчний уран зохиолыг шинжлэхүй. УБ., 2011. х.82-88. http://www.ergon-verlag.de/en/ (in Russian) Dr. Petrova M.P. Орчин үеийн утга зохиол дахь эртний домгууд: Г.Мэнд-Ооёогийн уран бүтээлийн зɵн билгийн гайхамшгууд. Нүүдэлчний уран зохиолыг шинжлэхүй. УБ., 2011. х.89-94. (in Mongolian) Ph.D B Magsarjav,  "The poet's achievement, separate from time" Mongolia, 2011 (in English) http://www.uyghurpen.org/the_poets_achievement.html
 Dr. Petrova M.P.. Древние легенды в современной литературе: мистическое очарование творчества Г.Мэнд-Ооёо. Нүүдэлчний уран зохиолыг шинжлэхүй. УБ., 2011. х.74-81.
 Niraj Kumar, India, "Confer Nobel Prize for Literature  to  G.Mend- Ooyo" 2011 http://ariseasia.blogspot.com/2011/07/confer-nobel-prize-for-literature-to.html (in English) Sheila Melvin, journalist, USA "In Mongolia, the Horse-Headed Fiddle Rides Again"  http://www.nytimes.com/2010/08/26/arts/26iht-melvin.html?pagewanted=all (in English) Lyn Coffin, poet, USA, "Introduction to 'Quickwit the Camel'" 2010 http://muzo.mn/en/1823
 Ruth O'Callaghan, poet and publisher, UK, "Introduction", G.Mend-Ooyo "A Patch of White Mists" Ulaanbaatar, 2010  (in English) Dr. Shaleen Kumar Singh, critic, India, "G. Mend Ooyo's All Shining Moments – a Psalm of Nomadism" 2009 http://www.creativesaplings.com/old/r3.html (in English) Dr. Petrova M.P. Mystical Enchantment of G.Mend-Ooyo's Works. (Мистическое очарование произведений Г.Мэнд-Ооёо.) 52 the meeting of the PIAC. Abstracts. Нuhe-hoto, 2009, p. 67. (in Russian) Prof. Ernesto Kahan, Poet and physician, Israel and Argentina, "Homage to G Mend Ooyo and his book entitled "Golden hill" 2008  (in English) Dr.Simon Wickham-Smith, translator and critic, UK, "Translator's introduction" 2007 http://muzo.mn/en/941 (in English) Litt.D. D. Uriankhai, poet, "Along other people's paths and around other people's wheels" 2007 http://muzo.mn/en/1821 (in English) Dr. Imre P. Zsoldos, poet and critic, Hungary-Taiwan, "A few heartfelt remarks about Gombojavyn Mend-Ooyo's poem" 2006 (Yaruunairag-shidetdolgion-II, (Poetry is magic wave), poetry critiques, p 187-191, Ulaanbaatar 2007) (in English) Dr., Prof. Ya.Baatar, critic, "Discovery of the majestic existence of Mongolian culture in the poetry of G.Mend-Ooyo"  Mongolia, 2005 http://muzo.mn/en/1820 (in Mongolian)''

References

External links 
 Mend-Ooyo.mn

Mongolian writers
People from Sükhbaatar Province
1952 births
Living people
20th-century Mongolian poets
21st-century Mongolian poets